Phalacropterix graslinella is a species of moth of the Psychidae family. It is found from France to southern Russia and from northern Italy to Fennoscandia and the Baltic region.

The wingspan is 17–21 mm for males. Females are wingless.

The larvae feed on Erica, including Empetrum nigrum, Calluna and possibly Vaccinium. They construct a bag from plant debris such as twigs.

External links
Fauna Europaea
microlepidoptera.nl

Psychidae
Moths of Europe
Moths described in 1852